The Haitian Socialist Party (abbreviated PSH) was a small political party in Haiti. The party was founded by Dr. René Salomon in February 1946. The ideology of PSH combined Marxism with Black nationalism. A certain number of writers and intellectuals joined the party.

Salomon contested the 1946 parliamentary election. Following the election Salomon and PSH argued that the disunity of the Marxist left had led to its defeat in the polls.

PSH published Classe Moyen et Masse as its organ.

References

African and Black nationalism in North America
African and Black nationalist parties
Afro-Haitian culture
Communist parties in Haiti
Defunct political parties in Haiti
Political parties established in 1946
Marxist parties in Haiti